Contessa Entellina is a small comune   in the Metropolitan City of Palermo, in Sicily, southern Italy.

The country, along with Piana degli Albanesi and Santa Cristina Gela, is among the three ethnic communities of Arbëreshë of Sicily, who still speak Albanian, carefully preserve the Orthodox rite, the Albanian costumes, musical and gastronomic traditions of the ancient Albania.

History

The foundation is attributed to about 1450 on the ruins of a remote farmhouse seniority, the "Comitissa", but the chapter officers, the granting of fiefs, were built in 1520, when he start the rebuilding, upgrading and restocking of Albanians from Albania and subsequently also by the southern Morea, from Albanian communities where they lived from 1300.

In ancient times it was near them the ancient Elymian city of Entella, in fact, with the discovery of archaeological ancient site, to give relief to the old site, you would add the name of the country, even the term Entella.

Today Contessa Entellina keeps the Albanian language, the culture of their ancestors, and holds the Byzantine rite (or Greek rite); but lives a very difficult period. From earthquake of Belice to date have followed many migrations, halving the population and depopulating the city center, the Albanian language is also taught to fewer and fewer young people so the community is constantly lost and stolen the identities.

People
Nicola Chetta (1741–1803), Byzantine-Greek rite priest, ethnographic, writer and poet.
Antonino Cuccia (1850–1938), popular poet whose work represent an important testimony of Arbëresh spoken in Contessa Entellina.
Vaccaro brothers
Lorenzo Tardo (1883–1967), Basilian priest and scholar of Byzantine music.
Vincenzo Scramuzza (1886?–1956), historian.
Leonardo Lala (1906–2000), writer and expert on Arbëreshë language, history, and folk traditions.
Giuseppe Schirò (junior)
Matteo Sciambra (1914–1967), Byzantine rite priest, university professor and writer, whose work focuses on the study of Arbëresh and on the preservation of the Byzantine liturgical heritage of the Arbëreshë communities in Sicily.
Bino (singer) (1953–2010), pop singer

See also
 Albania
 Byzantine Rite
 Eparchy of Piana degli Albanesi
 George Kastrioti Skanderbeg

References

External links

 Official website 

Arbëresh settlements
Elymians
Municipalities of the Metropolitan City of Palermo